Christopher "Chris" Hammer (born 30 March 1986) is an American paratriathlete and former para-athletics middle-distance runner. He was born without his left hand. He competed at the Paralympic Games three times: in para-athletics he ran the men's T46 marathon, 800m and 1500m at the 2012 Summer Paralympics and changed to paratriathlon for the 2016 and 2020 Summer Paralympics.

In 2018 he started coaching triathlon at Davis & Elkins College in Elkins, West Virginia. Hammer has level 2 coaching certification and is a member of the USA Triathlon Nationals Coaching Committee. Hammer has a master's degree in sport psychology from Eastern Washington University and from the University of Utah he has an MBA and a PhD in sport psychology.

References

1986 births
Living people
People from Mount Clemens, Michigan
Paralympic track and field athletes of the United States
Paratriathletes of the United States
American male triathletes
American male middle-distance runners
American male long-distance runners
Athletes (track and field) at the 2012 Summer Paralympics
Paratriathletes at the 2016 Summer Paralympics
Paratriathletes at the 2020 Summer Paralympics
Medalists at the 2011 Parapan American Games
21st-century American people